Final Fight Championship (FFC) is an international fighting sports promotion company founded in 2003 by the FFC owner and CEO Orsat Zovko. The company has its headquarters in Las Vegas, Nevada, USA, as well as a European office in Zagreb, Croatia.

FFC started as a kickboxing promotion, in 2013 FFC introduced MMA fights in its events as well as boxing matches in 2016.

Events

History

The Final Fight: Stars War

The Final Fight: Stars War was the first event produced by the Final Fight Championship that was held on 31 October 2003 at Dom Sportova in Zagreb, Croatia.

A heavyweight bout between Mike Bernardo and Sergei Gur served as the event headliner.

The event featured seven kickboxing matches, two of which were WKA title bouts. The fight card included international fighters like Mike Bernardo, Sergei Gur, Phillip Trapani and Vitali Akhramenko, as well as local fighters who were given a chance to prove themselves on their own turf, namely Ivica Perković, Ante Bilić and Josip Bodrožić. A German fighter of Croatian descent, Stefan Leko won his fight and in the final bout of the evening South African K-1 Mike Bernardo defeated Sergei Gur of Belarus via TKO in the second round.

Results

Cro Cop Final Fight
Cro Cop Final Fight was a kickboxing event produced by the Final Fight Championship that was held on 10 March 2012 at Arena Zagreb in Zagreb, Croatia.

Final Fight had a nine-year break before organizing its second event titled Cro Cop Final Fight.

The event was headlined by a heavyweight bout between Mirko Cro Cop and eight-time K-1 WGP finalist Ray Sefo. The bout also marked Mirko Cro Cop's return to kickboxing after nine years spent in mixed martial arts. Moreover, it was also first Cro Cop's major fight in front of his hometown audience.

In addition to Mirko Cro Cop and Sefo, the event, attended by a crowd of approximately 11,000 people, included the likes of former It's Showtime champion Daniel Ghiță, SUPERKOMBAT WGP winner Sergei Lascenko and former It's Showtime champion Sahak Parparyan. Up and coming local fighters also got a chance to make a name for themselves, such as Mladen Brestovac, Toni Milanović and Agron Preteni.

Results

FFC era

In March 2013, Fight Channel announced a series of events under the Final Fight brand, with the addition of the word "Championship" (C) in the promotion's name, revealing its intention to organize title bouts in the future. Also revealed was its new updated logo. FFC President Orsat Zovko announced that the promotion would hold at least 10 events in 2013, which would feature kickboxing and MMA bouts in equal measure. Each event was to have ten fights, four on the preliminary fight card and six on the main card. This was a novelty considering that the first two Final Fight events featured only kickboxing matches. The events were to be broadcast live on Fight Channel in Croatia, but also on many other international cable platforms. Zovko relied on the success of K-1 WGP Final event in Zagreb, Croatia, also produced and co-organized by Fight Channel in 2003 and ultimately won by Mirko Cro Cop. It was first K-1 WGP Final ever held outside Japan.

FFC 3: Jurković vs. Cătinaș
FFC 3: Jurković vs. Cătinaș was a mixed martial arts and kickboxing event produced by the Final Fight Championship that was held on 19 April 2013 at Gripe in Split, Croatia

The event was headlined by a heavyweight kickboxing bout between Igor Jurković and Raul Cătinaș.

Local fighter Agron Preteni who defeated favourite Romanian Andrei Stoica at the K-1 WGP Final several weeks earlier was also to fight at the event but he was forced to withdraw citing an injury. The promotion was unable to find a last-minute replacement for Preteni, which is why FFC 3 featured nine instead of the scheduled 10 fights.

In the first preliminary MMA bout of the evening, Ivan Gluhak defeated Dejan Milošević via stoppage at the end of the second round. Gluhak vs. Milošević was the first MMA bout in Final Fight Championship's history.

In the main event, Igor Jurković defeated Romanian Cătinaș via decision, while in the co-main event K-1 WGP Final semifinalist Pavel Zhuravlev KO'ed Italy's Luca Panto.

FFC 3 was broadcast live in more than fifty countries, including national TV stations in Croatia and Bosnia and Herzegovina. Croatian national TV network Nova TV later reported that FFC 3 had a 32% share in TV ratings, making the event the most watched show of that week.

After the event, Orsat Zovko announced the upcoming events in Zadar, Osijek and Poreč, as well as FFC's expansion and events in other countries of the Southeastern Europe.

Results

FFC 4: Perak vs. Joni
FFC 4: Perak vs. Joni was a mixed martial arts and kickboxing event produced by the Final Fight Championship that was held on 10 May 2013 at Višnjik in Zadar, Croatia.

The event was headlined by a heavyweight MMA bout between Maro Perak and Tibor Joni.

Only three weeks after its first event under the new name, Final Fight Championship held its first event in Zadar, Croatia. The event took place in Višnjik arena with the capacity of 9,500 seats. According to the media estimates, FFC 4 was attended by a 4,500-strong crowd, a significantly better result compared to the previous FFC 3 in Split. FFC 4 was the first event in the promotion's history with an MMA bout in the main event.

After numerous cancellations and injuries, Maro Perak. Perak called out Denis Stojnić, a former UFC fighter, but Stojnić refused the offer. Stojnić told the media that his goal was to make it back to the UFC and for that he needed a win over a big name like Mirko Cro Cop, Mustapha Al Turk, Andrei Arlovski or Jeff Monsont.

In the co-main event, Croatian kickboxing heavyweight Mladen Brestovac defeated Sergei Lascenko via decision after three rounds. Both fighters had previously participated in the K-1 WGP Final in Zagreb where Brestovac defeated Spain's Frank Munoz, while Lascenko lost to Dževad Poturak.

Poland's Maciej Browarski, who stepped in on short notice, pulled off a huge upset when he defeated one of the best European MMA lightheavyweight fighters, Jason Jones, in the first round.

Results

FFC 5: Rodriguez vs. Simonjič

FFC 5: Rodriguez vs. Simonjič was a mixed martial arts and kickboxing event produced by the Final Fight Championship that was held on 24 May 2013 at Gradski vrt in Osijek, Croatia.

The event was headlined by a heavyweight MMA bout between former UFC champion Ricco Rodriguez and Slovenia's Tomaž Simonjič.

In the co-main event, Ukraine's kickboxer Pavel Zhuravlev KO'ed the Netherlands's Vinchenzo Renfurm, making his second consecutive win in the FFC. Croatia's MMA Ante Delija and Ante Račić also achieved wins, while Bosnian Igor Emkić defeated Ivan Stanić fighting out of Croatia.

Only two bouts went the distance.

At the post-fight presser, Ricco Rodriguez called out former UFC fighter Denis Stojnić. Stojnić later refused that proposition claiming that UFC matchmaker Joe Silva wanted him to fight Mirko Cro Cop, Mustapha Al Turk, Andrei Arlovski or Jeff Monson.

Results

FFC 6: Jurković vs. Poturak
FFC 6: Jurković vs. Poturak was a mixed martial arts and kickboxing event produced by the Final Fight Championship that was held on 14 June 2013 at Žatika Sport Centre in Poreč, Croatia.

The event was headlined by a kickboxing heavyweight bout between Igor Jurković and Dževad Poturak.

FFC 6 marked the second FFC event headlined by Igor Jurković after FFC 3 in Split, Croatia, on 19 April 2013.

The co-main event featured two top kickboxing heavyweights. The Dutch Hesdy Gerges defeated Pavel Zhuravlev via split decision. The bout marked Zhuravlev's first FFC defeat after two wins.

Hungary's Laszlo Senyei defeated Ivica Trušček via unanimous decision in an MMA welterweight bout.

Ibrahim El Bouni beat Bosnian kickboxer Igor Emkić in 29 seconds via a KO.

At the post-fight presser, FFC President Orsat Zovko announced the upcoming fall events in Sarajevo (Bosnia and Herzegovina), Pula (Croatia), Zagreb (Croatia), Skopje (Macedonia) and Ljubljana (Slovenia).

Results

FFC 7: Poturak vs. Munoz 
FFC 7: Poturak vs. Munoz was a mixed martial arts and kickboxing event produced by the Final Fight Championship that was held on 13 March 2015 at Skenderija in Sarajevo, Bosnia and Herzegovina.

FFC 7 was originally scheduled for 4 September 2013 but it was cancelled due to Poturak's injury and other technical issues. However, FFC wanted to produce an event in Sarajevo, Bosnia and Herzegovina, and the opportunity appeared two years later.

The event was headlined by a kickboxing heavyweight bout between Dževad Poturak and Frank Munoz, while the MMA headliner featured Tomislav Spahović and Kamen Georgiev.

Hungary's MMA prospect Laszlo Senyei finished Dawid Defort via GNP in the third round, while heavyweight kickboxers Tomislav Čikotić and Elmir Mehić were awarded the title of 'Fight of the night'.

Results

FFC 8: Zelg vs. Rodriguez
FFC 8: Zelg vs. Rodriguez was a mixed martial arts and kickboxing event produced by the Final Fight Championship that was held on 25 October 2013 at Arena Zagreb, Zagreb, Croatia.

The event was headlined by an MMA catchweight bout between Zelg Galešić and Ricco Rodriguez with Rodriguez defeating his opponent via submission in the first round.

The co-main event featured a kickboxing heavyweight bout between Mladen Brestovac and Ali Cenik that went the distance in favor of Mladen Brestovac.

Glory's Jahfarr Wilnis made his FFC debut at FFC 8 in Zagreb, Croatia, where he lost to Tomáš Hron.

Results

FFC 9: McSweeney vs. Traunmuller
FFC 9: McSweeney vs. Traunmuller was a mixed martial arts and kickboxing event produced by the Final Fight Championship that was held on 15 November 2013 at Tivoli Hall, Ljubljana, Slovenia.

In November 2013, FFC held its first event outside of Croatia. FFC 9 was also the first event in the FFC's history that featured two events in one night with kickboxing and MMA sections held separately.

The MMA part of the event was headlined by a heavyweight bout between James McSweeney and Stefan Traunmuller. At FFC 9 James McSweeney made his FFC debut and defeated Traunmuller by a first round submission via armbar.

The co-main event featured Primož Vrbinc and Joseph Leitner, while the most anticipated bout of the night was the grudge match between Slovenia's Lemmy Krušič and Vaso Bakočević fighting out of Montenegro that went the distance in favor of Krušič.

The kickboxing part of the event was headlined by Mirko Vorkapič and Chris Ngimbi with Vorkapić pulling an upset and defeating favored former It's Showtime champion Ngimbi.

In the co-main event Ibrahim El Bouni made a successful FFC return defeating favored local kickboxer Miran Fabjan.

Results

FFC 10: Rodriguez vs. Batzelas

FFC 10: Rodriguez vs. Batzelas  was a mixed martial arts and kickboxing event produced by the Final Fight Championship that was held on 13 December 2013 at Boris Trajakovski Sports Center, Skopje, Republic of Macedonia.

The event was the first that the FFC has hosted in Skopje, Republic of Macedonia.

The MMA part of the event was headlined by a heavyweight bout between former UFC heavyweight champion Ricco Rodriguez and Greek mixed martial artist and former Olympic wrestler Nestoras Baltzelas. Rodriguez defeated his opponent via second-round TKO.

The co-main event featured Dutch/Albanian professional wrestler Gzim Selmani and Slovenia's Tomaž Simonič with Selmani winning the bout in the first round via RNC. Local MMA fighter Risto Dimitrov stepped into the ring versus Greece's Georgios Vardis eventually winning via decision.

The kickboxing part of the event was headlined by a heavyweight bout between Rustemi Kreshnik and Croatia's Dino Belošević while Mladen Brestovac vs. Kirk Krouba served as the co-main event. Tomáš Hron scored another FFC win after defeating Croatia's Igor Mihaljević in a heavyweight clash.

Results

FFC Futures 1
FFC Futures 1 was a mixed martial arts and kickboxing event produced by the Final Fight Championship that was held on 1 March 2014 at Marino Cvetković Sports Hall in Opatija, Croatia.

In 2014 Final Fight Championship launched its FFC Futures series – a series of kickboxing and MMA tournaments for younger, aspiring fighters. The winners of the tournament signed a deal with the promotion while the event also featured two super fights including Stipe Bekavac vs. Eddie Sanchez and Ivan Stanić vs. Patrick Van Rees.

Results

FFC 11: Jurković vs. Kaluđerović

FFC 11: Jurković vs. Kaluđerović was a mixed martial arts and kickboxing event produced by the Final Fight Championship that was held 4 April 2014 at Gradski vrt Hall in Osijek, Croatia.

The kickboxing part of the event was headlined by a light heavyweight bout between Igor Jurković and Jovan Kaluđerović.

The MMA part of the event was headlined by a heavyweight bout between Stipe Bekavac and former UFC and Bellator fighter Eddie "The Manic Hispanic" Sanchez.

In the co-main event of the MMA part of the event Saša Milinković submitted Stefan Traunmuller via arm triangle choke, while Bekavac brutally KO'ed Sanchez in the first round of the headliner.

The first bout of the event featured Ivica Tadijanov and Poland's Marcin Prachnio. Croatia's Ivan Gluhak beat Luca Vitali by a TKO.

Results

FFC 12: Fabjan vs. Daley

FFC 12: Fabjan vs. Daley was a mixed martial arts and kickboxing event produced by the Final Fight Championship that was held 25 April 2014 at Tivoli Hall, Ljubljana, Slovenia.

The event was the second that the FFC has hosted at Tivoli Hall in Ljubljana, Slovenia.

The kickboxing part of the event was headlined by a welterweight bout between Bellator's Paul Daley and Miran Fabjan with Daley knocking our Fabjan in the second round

The co-main event bout between Croatia's Teo Mikelić and Slovenia's Mirko Vorkapič ended via doctor's stoppage in the first round since Vorkapič sustained a periorbital hematoma. The kickboxing part of the event kicked off brutally with Mladen Kujunđić's knockout win over Dženan Poturak. In a heavyweight match up Elmir Mehić defeated local favorite Rok Štrucl, while Slovenia's up-and-comer Samo Petje stopped Kevin Hesseling in the first round. The only kickboxing bout that went the distance was the one between Denis Chorchyp and Darian Paladin.

In the MMA headliner Dion 'The Soldier' Staring defeated Tomaž Simonič via submission.

The bout between Hungary's Viktor Halmi and Slovenia's Primož Vrbinc served as the co-main event.

Croatia's MMA up-and-comer Luka Jelčić and Krasimir Georgiev opened the MMA part of the event with Jelčić finishing his opponent via GNP. Antun Račić showcased his ground game finishing Zoltan Turi via armbar. Croatia's Ivica Trušček defeated Michael Pfunder via RNC, while Slovenia's Bor Bratovž submitted his opponent in the first round.

Results

FFC Futures 2
FFC Futures 2 was a mixed martial arts and kickboxing event produced by the Final Fight Championship that was held on 3 May 2014 at Marino Cvetković Sports Hall in Opatija, Croatia.

The event was the second in the FFC Futures series – a series of kickboxing and MMA tournaments for younger, aspiring fighters. The winners of the tournament signed a deal with the promotion while the event also featured two super fights including an MMA heavyweight bout between Ante Delija and Ruben Wolf as well as a heavyweight kickboxing match between Mladen Brestovac and Tomas Pakutinskas.

Results

FFC 13: Jurković vs. Tavares

FFC 13: Jurković vs. Tavares was a mixed martial arts and kickboxing event produced by the Final Fight Championship that was held 6 June 2014 at Krešimir Ćosić Hall in Zadar, Croatia.

The event was the second that the FFC has hosted at Krešimir Ćosić Hall in Zadar, Croatia.

The event was headlined by a light heavyweight kickboxing bout between Igor Jurković and Luis Tavares. Jurković dominated throughout the whole match and won via unanimous decision.

In the co-main event Sergei Lascenko TKO'ed Dimitris Delis.

The MMA part of the event was headlined by a heavyweight bout between Ruben Wolf fighting out of Germany and Croatia's Saša Milinković. Wolf brutally KO'ed his opponent via soccer kick.

The grueling bout between Matej Batinić and Ivan Brkljača served as the co-main event.

Results

FFC Futures 3
FFC Futures 3 was a mixed martial arts and kickboxing event produced by the Final Fight Championship that was held on 27 September 2014 at Sutinska Vrela Sports Hall in Zagreb, Croatia.

The event was the third in the FFC Futures series – a series of kickboxing and MMA tournaments for younger, aspiring fighters. The winners of the tournament signed a deal with the promotion while the event also featured two super fights including an MMA heavyweight bout between Ante Delija and Archontis Taxiarchis as well as a heavyweight kickboxing match between Mladen Brestovac and Luca Panto.

Results

FFC 14: Račić vs. Krušič
FFC 14: Račić vs. Krušić was a mixed martial arts and kickboxing event produced by the Final Fight Championship that was held 3 October 2014 at Tivoli Hall in Ljubljana, Slovenia.

The event was the third that the FFC has hosted at Tivoli Hall in Ljubljana, Slovenia.

FFC 14 also featured FFC's inaugural kickboxing title bout that featured Samo Petje and Teo Mikelić in lightweight division as well as FFC's inaugural MMA title bout between Lemmy Krušič and Antun Račićin featherweight division.

The MMA part of the event was headlined by an inaugural featherweight title bout between Croatia's Antun Račić and Slovenia's Lemmy Krušič. After three grueling rounds, Račić won via unanimous decision and thus became the FFC's first featherweight MMA champion.

In the MMA co-event, Poland's light heavyweight Marcin Prachnio brutally TKO'ed Croatia's Stipe Bekavac.

The kickboxing part of the event was headlined by an inaugural lightweight match between Slovenia's Samo Petje and Croatia's Teo Mikelić who was KO'ed in the first round. Samo Petje became FFC's first kickboxing champion.

In the co-main event, Slovenia's light heavyweight Denis Chorchyp defeated Dženan Poturak.

Results

FFC Futures 4 
FFC Futures 4 was a mixed martial arts and kickboxing event produced by the Final Fight Championship that was held on 21 November 2014 at Žatika Sport Center in Poreč, Croatia.

The event was the fourth in the FFC Futures series – a series of kickboxing and MMA tournaments for younger, aspiring fighters. The winners of the tournament signed a deal with the promotion.

Results

FFC 15: Jurković vs. Stolzenbach
FFC 15: Jurković vs. Stolzenbach was a mixed martial arts and kickboxing event produced by the Final Fight Championship that was held on 21 November 2014 at Žatika Sport Center in Poreč, Croatia.

The event was headlined by a light heavyweight kickboxing bout between Igor Jurković and Dennis Stolzenbach.

In the kickboxing co-main event, FFC lightweight champion Samo Petje fought Milan Paleš in a non-title bout and won via TKO in the second round.

The MMA part of the event was headlined by the inaugural FFC MMA lightweight title bout between Viktor Halmi and Matej Truhan. Hungary's Viktor Halmi won via TKO in the third round.

MMA co-main event featured a featherweight bout between Filip Pejić and Francisco Albano Barrio that ended with a highlight reel TKO.

Results

FFC 16: Sakara vs. Browarski
FFC 16: Sakara vs. Browarski was a mixed martial arts, kickboxing and boxing event produced by the Final Fight Championship that was held on 6 December 2014 at Multiversum Schwechat in Vienna, Austria.

This event was the first FFC event hosted in Vienna, Austria.

The event was headlined by a light heavyweight MMA bout between former UFC fighter Alessio Sakara and Maciej Browarski. Nandor Guelmino was expected to face Croatia's heavyweight Maro Perak in the headliner, but he pulled out due to injury.

In the MMA co-main event, Philipp Schranz defeated Lemmy Kušič via guillotine in the first round.

The kickboxing part of the event was headlined by a welterweight inaugural title bout between Shkodran Veseli and Douli Chen. Veseli was expected to face Paul Daley, but Daley pulled out.

In the kickboxing co-main event Fadi Meriza did his farewell bout against Gianfranco Capurso, knocking Capursko out in the first round.

FFC 16 was FFC's first event that introduced boxing matches on its preliminary card as well the first FFC event that featured female boxers. Nicole Wesner defeated Gina Chamie for the vacant WIBF Woman's International lightweight title and vacant World Boxing Federation female lightweight title.

ResultsFFC 16 MMA: Ozljeda Sakare zasjenila sjajnu večer austrijskih boraca

FFC 17 Futures Super Finals 
FFC 17: Futures Super Finals was a mixed martial arts and kickboxing event produced by the Final Fight Championship that was held on 20 December 2014 at Marino Cvetković Sports Hall in Opatija, Croatia.

The event served as the end-of-the-year finale of the FFC Futures series – a series of kickboxing and MMA tournaments for younger, aspiring fighters. The winners of the tournament signed a deal with the promotion.

The event also featured two kickboxing super fights. Mladen Brestovac defeated Wiesław Kwaśniewski thus winning the FFC inaugural kickboxing heavyweight title. Local kickboxing favorite Ivan Stanić defeated Bahrudin Mahmić.

In the MMA super fight Dion Staring defeated former UFC heavyweight champion Ricco Rodriguez and won the FFC's inaugural heavyweight MMA title.

Results

FFC 18: Pokrajac vs. Taxiarchis 
FFC 18: Pokrajac vs. Taxiarchis was a mixed martial arts and kickboxing event produced by the Final Fight Championship that was held on 17 April 2015 at Arena Stožice in Ljubljana, Slovenia.

After holding three previous events in Ljubljana, Slovenia, the event was the first that the organization has hosted at Arena Stožice.

The MMA part of the event was headlined by a heavyweight bout between former UFC fighter Igor Pokrajac and Archontis Taxiarchis. Igor Pokrajac made successful FFC debut defeating Taxiarchis vis first-round KO.

In the MMA co-main event Laszlo Senyei and Tonči Peruško fought in a welterweight contender bout. Senyei won via first-round RNC and secured his #1 position as a contender.

Filip Pejić and Slobodan Maksimović fought for the lightweight contender position but the bout was ruled out as No Contest.

The kickboxing part of the event was headlined by a title bout between FFC lightweight champion Samo Petje and Valentin Rybalko. Petje successfully defended his title.

In the kickboxing co-main event Mladen Brestovac defended his FFC heavyweight title against Colin George.

Results

FFC 19: Sakara vs. Akil 
FFC 19: Sakara vs. Akil was a mixed martial arts and kickboxing event produced by the Final Fight Championship that was held on 18 September 2015 at TipsArena Linz in Linz, Austria.

FFC 20: Pokrajac vs. Maisuradze 
FFC 20: Pokrajac vs. Maisuradze was a mixed martial arts and kickboxing event produced by the Final Fight Championship that was held on 23 October 2015 at Dvorana Dražena Petrovića in Zagreb, Croatia.

FFC 21: Staring vs. Kraniotakes 
FFC 21: Staring vs. Kraniotakes was a mixed martial arts and kickboxing event produced by the Final Fight Championship that was held on 27 November 2015 in Rijeka, Croatia.

FFC 22: Van Roosmalen vs. Michailidis 
FFC 22: Van Roosmalen vs. Michailidis was a mixed martial arts and kickboxing event produced by the Final Fight Championship that was held on 19 February 2016 in Athens, Greece.

FFC 23: Sadeghi vs. Movsisyan 
FFC 23: Sadeghi vs. Movsisyan was a mixed martial arts and kickboxing event produced by the Final Fight Championship that was held on 18 March 2016 in Vienna, Austria.

FFC 24: Villefort vs. Rela 
FFC 24: Villefort vs. Rela was a mixed martial arts and kickboxing event produced by the Final Fight Championship that was held on 4 June 2016 in Daytona Beach, FL, United States.

FFC 25: Mitchell vs. Lopez 
FFC 25: Mitchell vs. Lopez was a mixed martial arts and kickboxing event produced by the Final Fight Championship that was held on 11 June 2016 in Springfield, MA, United States.

FFC 26: Staring vs. Stošić 
FFC 26: Staring vs. Stošić was a mixed martial arts and kickboxing event produced by the Final Fight Championship that was held on 24 September 2016 in Linz, Austria.

FFC 27: Stošić vs. Staring 
FFC 27: Stošić vs. Staring was a mixed martial arts and kickboxing event produced by the Final Fight Championship that was held on 17 December 2016 in Zagreb, Croatia.

FFC 28: Van Roosmalen vs. Dimitrov 
FFC 28: Van Roosmalen vs. Dimitrov was a mixed martial arts and kickboxing event produced by the Final Fight Championship that was held on 11 March 2017 in Athens, Greece.

FFC 29: Petje vs. Danenberg 
FFC 29: Petje vs. Danenberg was a mixed martial arts and kickboxing event produced by the Final Fight Championship that was held on 22 April 2017 in Ljubljana, Slovenia.

FFC 30: Ishii vs. Schmiedeberg 
FFC 30: Ishii vs. Schmiedeberg was a mixed martial arts and kickboxing event produced by the Final Fight Championship that was held on 21 October 2017 in Linz, Austria.

FFC 31: Neves vs. Egli 
FFC 31: Neves vs. Egli was a mixed martial arts and kickboxing event produced by the Final Fight Championship that was held on 12 October 2018 in Las Vegas, Nevada, United States.

FFC 32: Graves vs. Seumanutafa 
FFC 32: Graves vs. Seumanutafa was a mixed martial arts and kickboxing event produced by the Final Fight Championship that was held on 19 October 2018 in Las Vegas, Nevada, United States.

FFC 33: Chub vs. Vrtačić 
FFC 33: Chub vs. Vrtačić was a mixed martial arts, kickboxing and boxing  event produced by the Final Fight Championship that was held on 3 November 2018 in Las Vegas, Nevada, United States.

FFC 34: Petje vs. Gazani 
FFC 34: Petje vs. Gazani was a mixed martial arts, kickboxing and boxing event produced by the Final Fight Championship that was held on 17 November 2018 in Las Vegas, Nevada, United States.

FFC 35: Egli vs. Holt 
FFC 35: Egli vs. Holt was a mixed martial arts, kickboxing and boxing event produced by the Final Fight Championship that was held on 19 April 2019 in Las Vegas, Nevada, United States.

FFC 36: Chub vs. Ambang 
FFC 36: Chub vs. Ambang was a mixed martial arts and kickboxing event produced by the Final Fight Championship that was held on 10 May 2019 in Las Vegas, Nevada, United States.

FFC 37: Santiago vs. Martinez 
FFC 37: Santiago vs. Martinez was a mixed martial arts event produced by the Final Fight Championship that was held on 30 May 2019 in Las Vegas, Nevada, United States.

FFC 38: Cucciniello vs. Emmers 
FFC 38: Cucciniello vs. Emmers was a mixed martial arts event produced by the Final Fight Championship that was held on 20 June 2019 in Las Vegas, Nevada, United States.

FFC 39: Jones vs. Powell 
FFC 39: Jones vs. Powell was a mixed martial arts, kickboxing and boxing event produced by the Final Fight Championship that was held on 11 July 2019 in Las Vegas, Nevada, United States.

FFC 40: Egli vs. Lemminger 
FFC 40: Egli vs. Lemminger was a mixed martial arts , kickboxing and boxing event produced by the Final Fight Championship that was held on 5 September 2019 in Las Vegas, Nevada, United States.

Rules

The FFC holds fights at its events under the rules of kickboxing and those of mixed martial arts. There is no standardized ratio between kickboxing and MMA fights; it varies from one event to another. The FFC kickboxing rules are the modified rules of the legendary Japanese kickboxing promotion K-1. These include a 10-point must system, three rounds plus one extra round in case of a draw and no clinch allowed. Each round in a kickboxing fight has the duration of three minutes, and intermissions between each round are one minute long.

The FFC's MMA rules are the modified rules of the legendary Japanese MMA promotion Pride. These include a 10-point must system taken from the Unified Rules of MMA, but also allow soccer kicks and stomps, which are excluded from the Unified Rules of MMA. The rules do not allow elbow strikes to the head. Each of the three rounds (there are no extra rounds) last five minutes, and intermissions between each round are one minute long.

The president of the promotion Orsat Zovko stated that the FFC was considering additional innovations in terms of rules to bring the promotion closer to the standards required by public TV networks that broadcast the event live during primetime hours. Specifically, he said that in the future the FFC could exclude techniques that may be considered excessively violent by the mainstream audience, such as soccer kicks and stomps.

Weight classes and champions

The FFC is currently using six weight classes for its MMA fights and five weight classes for its kickboxing fights. Non-title fights have a one-pound leniency.

Mixed martial arts

Kickboxing

References

External links

Sports organizations of Croatia
Sports organizations established in 2003
Kickboxing television series
Kickboxing organizations
Mixed martial arts organizations
Entertainment companies of Croatia